Francis Edward Su is an American mathematician.  He joined the Harvey Mudd College faculty in 1996, and is currently Benediktsson-Karwa Professor of Mathematics.  Su served as president of the Mathematical Association of America from 2015–2017 and is serving as a Vice President of the American Mathematical Society from 2020-2023.  Su has received multiple awards from the MAA, including the Henry L. Alder Award and the Haimo Award, both for distinguished teaching. He was also a Phi Beta Kappa Visiting Scholar during the 2019-2020 term. 

Su received his B.S. in Mathematics from the University of Texas, graduating Phi Beta Kappa in 1989. He went on to receive his Ph.D. from Harvard University, where his advisor was Persi Diaconis. His research area is combinatorics, and he is particularly known for his work on fair division.

Su and Michael Starbird are co-authors of the book "Topology Through Inquiry". His book, "Mathematics for Human Flourishing", was released on 7 January 2020. The latter book is based on his speech of the same title,  delivered Jan 6, 2017 at the Joint Math Meetings. He won the Halmos-Ford Award for Distinguished Writing in 2018 for that speech. Three of his articles have been featured on "The Princeton Anthology of the Best Writing in Mathematics" in the years 2011, 2014, and 2018. In 2021 he received the Euler Book Prize jointly with Christopher Jackson.

Selected publications

References

External links
 Home page at Harvey Mudd
 Author page
 Twitter account

American mathematicians
Harvey Mudd College faculty
Presidents of the Mathematical Association of America
Year of birth missing (living people)
Living people
Harvard University alumni
American academics of Chinese descent
University of Texas at Austin alumni
Fair division researchers